{| class="infobox" style="width: 22em; text-align: left; font-size: 80%; vertical-align: middle;"
|+ List of Javier Bardem awards and nominations
|-
| colspan="3" style="text-align:center;" | 
Bardem receiving a star on the Hollywood Walk of Fame in 2012
|- style="background:#d9e8ff; text-align:center;"
!style="vertical-align: middle;"| Award
| style="background:#cec; font-size:8pt; width:60px;"| Wins| style="background:#ecc; font-size:8pt; width:60px;"| Nominations
|- style="background:#eef;"
|align="center"|
Academy Awards
|
|
|- bgcolor=#eeeeff
|align="center"|
BAFTA Award
|
|
|- bgcolor=#eeeeff
|align="center"|
Golden Globe Awards
|
|
|- bgcolor=#eeeeff
|align="center"|
Screen Actors Guild Award
|
|
|}

The following is a list of awards and nominations received by Spanish actor Javier Bardem. 

Bardem is the recipient of an Academy Award, a British Academy Film Award, a Screen Actors Guild Award and a Golden Globe Award, all of which he won for his performance as Anton Chigurh in the Coen Brothers modern western film No Country for Old Men (2007). He has been nominated for three additional Academy Awards (all for Best Actor), the first for Julian Schnabel's Before Night Falls (2000), another for Alejandro González Iñárritu's Biutiful (2010), and the third for Aaron Sorkin's Being the Ricardos (2021). He received the Cannes Film Festival Award for Best Actor for his performance in Biutiful and two Venice Film Festival Awards for Best Actor for Before Night Falls, and Biutiful.

Major associations

Academy Awards

BAFTA Awards

Golden Globe Awards

Screen Actors Guild Awards

Major Festival awards

Cannes Film Festival

Venice Film Festival

Industry Awards

Critics' Choice Awards

European Film Awards

Independent Spirit Awards

Goya Awards

Miscellaneous awards

Golden Raspberry Awards

Teen Choice Awards

Notes

See also
Javier Bardem filmography

References

External links
List of awards from IMDb

Bardem, Javier